Pseudohypatopa ramusella is a moth in the family Blastobasidae. It was described by Adamski and H.H. Li in 2010. It is found in China (Beijing).

References

Natural History Museum Lepidoptera generic names catalog

Blastobasidae
Moths described in 2010